Mokama is a town and a municipal council in barh of Patna district in the Indian state of Bihar. Mokama is the connecting town of north and south Bihar and has 2nd highest amount of lentil production in India. It emerged as an industrial area in State of Bihar after independence.

Indian independence movement 
 
The place where the revolutionary freedom fighter Prafulla Chaki was martyred is marked by a shaheed gate. People commemorate the anniversary of his death every year.
Lalldin Saheb is yet another well known freedom fighter from Mokama who contributed in freedom struggle and was sentenced to jail during British rule.
He worked for the welfare of the people of Mokama throughout his life. Had major contribution in reopening the Bharat Wagon Engineering Company of Mokama that is source of income of thousands of families.

Transport 
Mokama is connected to all the major cities of India by rail and road. Hathidah is the junction point of NH 80 and NH 31. Mokama Junction is the railway station.

Demographics 
, Mokama had a population of 84,129. Males constituted 52.2% of the population and females 47.8%. Mokama had a literacy rate of 96.4%, higher than the state average of 61.80%. 94.34% of the population were Hindus, with the remaining 5.66% from ethnic minorites. 5.11% of the population were Muslims. Male literacy was around 99% while female literacy was 93.8%.
8,995 people were aged 0 to 6, constituting 14.82% of the population. The literacy rate of 72.79% was higher than the state average of 61.80%. The female sex ratio was 880 against the state average of 918. Moreover, the child sex ratio in was 869 compared to the state average of 935.

Villages
 

Mokama Ghat
Samya Garh, Bihar
aunta chandravhan tola

References 

Cities and towns in Patna district
Neighbourhoods in Patna